Charles Olmsted may refer to:

 Charles Sanford Olmsted (1853–1918), bishop of the Episcopal Diocese of Colorado
 Charles M. Olmsted (1881–1948), American aeronautical engineer

See also
Charles Olmstead (disambiguation)